William Hugh Montgomery  (1866–1958) was a New Zealand politician of the Liberal Party, from the Canterbury region.

He was the son of William Montgomery, who had represented the Akaroa electorate.

Montgomery represented the electorate in the 12th and 13th parliaments until 1899, when he was defeated.

In the 1919 King's Birthday Honours, Montgomery was appointed a Commander of the Order of the British Empire, for services as assistant director of the Base Records Office during World War I.

References

Further reading

New Zealand Liberal Party MPs
1866 births
1958 deaths
New Zealand Commanders of the Order of the British Empire
19th-century New Zealand politicians